The Côte Sauvage [English: Wild Coast], is in the Charente-Maritime department on the Atlantic coast of France. The Côte Sauvage starts near La Palmyre, north of Royan, and stretches north-west around the point La Tremblade. L’île d’Oléron, France's second-largest island (after Corsica), is just off the Côte Sauvage.

References
 Côte Sauvage on the Atlantic Coast, Charente-Maritime Accessed July 2010

Landforms of Charente-Maritime
Sauvage, Charente Maritime